Melanoma-associated antigen D2 is a protein that in humans is encoded by the MAGED2 gene.

This gene is a member of the MAGED gene family. While the MAGEA and MAGEB genes are silent in normal tissues with the exception of testis and placenta, the MAGED genes are expressed ubiquitously. The MAGED genes are clustered on chromosome Xp11. This gene is located in Xp11.2, a hot spot for X-linked mental retardation (XLMR). Multiple alternatively spliced transcript variants have been found for this gene, however, the full length nature of some variants has not been defined.

References

Further reading